Nudopella is a subgenus of flies belonging to the family Lesser Dung flies.

Species
T. collinella (Richards, 1946)
T. hem Roháček & Marshall, 1986
T. leucoptera (Haliday, 1836)
T. operta Roháček & Marshall, 1986

References

Sphaeroceridae
Diptera of Asia
Diptera of Australasia
Muscomorph flies of Europe
Insect subgenera